Omar José Prieto Fernández (born 25 May 1969), is a Venezuelan economist and politician who was governor of Zulia from 2017 to 2021. He was mayor of San Francisco, Zulia, for two consecutive periods.

Political career 
In 2008, he was elected mayor of the San Francisco municipality of Zulia, and reelected again in 2013.

In 2015, he ran as a candidate for deputy to the National Assembly where he was the winner, later Prieto resigned his seat before starting the period in 2016 to remain in his initial position as mayor of San Francisco.

Governor of Zulia 
On 10 December 2017, he accedes to the position of governor of the Zulia state in dubious circumstances. The elected governor in regional elections on 15 October 2017, Juan Pablo Guanipa was dismissed by the Legislative Council of Zulia. After the repetition of the elections, Omar Prieto is elected as Governor by the United Socialist Party of Venezuela (PSUV) with 57.35% of the votes, before the opposition candidate Manuel Rosales. 

On 10 July 2020, Prieto tested positive for COVID-19, during the pandemic in Venezuela.

Controversies

Threats to opponents 
On 11 February 2019, Prieto at a rally in the Rosario de Perijá municipality, launched a threat against opponents who are pushing for humanitarian aid to enter the country, which is led by several countries in the region. Prieto affirmed that the opponents of Chavismo were no longer called "emaciated", but "traitors to the homeland," for supporting what, in his opinion, is an American military intervention. He stated that if "the gringos put a boot here we have to look for the traitors," referring to the opponents of such armed intervention.

Sanctions 

On 25 February 2019, the Office of Foreign Assets Control (OFAC) of the United States Department of the Treasury placed sanctions in effect against Prieto and governors of 3 other Venezuelan states for alleged involvement in corruption and in blocking the delivery of humanitarian aid.

Prieto was sanctioned by the Canadian government on 15 April 2019 under the Special Economic Measures Act. The government statement said "the sanctions hit high ranking officials of the Maduro regime, regional governors, and people directly implicated in activities undermining democratic institutions." Foreign Minister Chrystia Freeland stated, "The Maduro dictatorship must be held accountable for this crisis and depriving Venezuelans of their most basic rights and needs. Canada is committed to supporting the peaceful restoration of constitutional democracy in Venezuela."

References 

1969 births
Living people
Venezuelan politicians
20th-century Venezuelan economists
Governors of Zulia
United Socialist Party of Venezuela politicians
People from Zulia
People of the Crisis in Venezuela